Santa Helena may refer to:

 Helena of Constantinople, the mother of Emperor Constantine the Great
 Saint Helena, an island in the South Atlantic Ocean
 Santa Helena de Goiás, a municipality in Brazil
 Santa Helena de Minas, a municipality in Brazil
 Santa Helena, Paraná, a municipality in Brazil
 Santa Helena, Santa Catarina, a municipality in Brazil
 Santa Helena, Maranhão, a municipality in Brazil
 Santa Helena del Opón, a town and municipality in Colombia
 Grupo Santa Helena, a group of painters
 Santa Helena Esporte Clube, a Brazilian football (soccer) club

See also 
 Saint Helena (disambiguation)
 Sainte-Hélène (disambiguation)
 St. Helen (disambiguation)
 St Helens (disambiguation)